Kim Joon-tae (Hangul: 김준태) is a South Korean taekwondo practitioner.

In 2009, he finished in 1st place in the Korean trials for the World Championships and became a member of the South Korean national taekwondo team for the first time in his career. At the 2009 World Taekwondo Championships in Copenhagen, Denmark, Kim won the gold medal in the lightweight division (-74 kg).
 
In the semifinal match, he beat 2005 world champion Mark López 7–5, landing three-point head kicks twice in Round 2.

References 

Living people
South Korean male taekwondo practitioners
Year of birth missing (living people)
World Taekwondo Championships medalists
21st-century South Korean people